Gilles Rampillon (born 28 July 1953 in Aubiers) is a French former professional footballer. He is a historic player of FC Nantes.

External links
 
 
Profile

1953 births
Living people
French footballers
France international footballers
FC Nantes players
AS Cannes players
Ligue 1 players
Association football forwards